Galpo Holeo Satti is a 1966 comedic Bengali film directed by Tapan Sinha. It stars Bhanu Banerjee, Jogesh Chatterjee, Bharati Devi, Chaya Devi, Ajoy Ganguli, Rabi Ghosh, Rudraprasad Sengupta. Later the film was twice remade in Hindi as Bawarchi, starring Rajesh Khanna, Hero No. 1, starting Govinda in the title role which was remade in Tamil as Samayalkaaran and in Kannada twice as Sakala Kala Vallabha and No 73, Shanthi Nivasa.

Throughout the years, the film has become immensely popular in Bengal and is often considered a cult classic in Bengali.

Plot

A new servant arrives in a family which is suffering from internal tension. The new servant, whose identity is itself under suspicion, gradually becomes lovable to all of the family members including the old ailing family head. The story unravels how this new man in their life helps each of the family members to find out new meaning in their individual lives as well as find out the happiness of a close-knit family.

As the name is translated in English as "Truth seems like a fiction" the film introduces a character in the first half who is indescribably happy, fond of doing work and very much skillful at everything under the sun. He comes as a servant to the family of nearly 10 members when they are in critical need of someone like him. They have lost the peace in their life, getting angry over others over silliest reasons. Then this man appears like an angel. With his mastery at doing household work, intellectual ideas, and even cultural abilities he makes everyone happy and all the good things start happening magically.

In the end, when the whole family is happy and reunited, he leaves all of a sudden without notifying anyone. He remains a mystery till the end.

Cast
 Dhanonjoy: Rabi Ghosh
 Baba: Jogesh Chattapadhyay
 Barokhoka: Prasad Mukhopadhyay
 Barobou: Chaya Devi
 Sejokhoka: Bankim Ghosh
 Sejobou: Bharati Devi
 Chotokhoka: Bhanu Bandopadhyay
 Khoka: Ajoy Ganguli
 Boss: Rudraprasad Sengupta
 Thief: Chinmoy Ray
 Krishna: Krishna Basu
 Alok:  Partho Mukherjee

Soundtrack

References

External links

ftvdb.bfi.org.uk

1966 films
Bengali-language Indian films
1966 comedy-drama films
Indian comedy-drama films
Bengali films remade in other languages
1960s Bengali-language films
Indian family films
Films about dysfunctional families
Cooking films